Kim Hye-ok (born May 9, 1958) is a South Korean actress.

Filmography

Television series

Film

Awards and nominations

References

External links
 
 
 

1958 births
Living people
20th-century South Korean actresses
21st-century South Korean actresses
South Korean film actresses
South Korean television actresses
South Korean stage actresses
Seoul Institute of the Arts alumni
Chung-Ang University alumni
South Korean Buddhists